Steinlager (sometimes known as Steinlager Classic) is a lager-style beer brewed by Lion in East Tāmaki, a suburb of Auckland, New Zealand. It has won several prizes, notably at beer competitions in the United States, and is New Zealand's biggest export beer.

History 
In 1957 the New Zealand Minister of Finance, Arnold Nordmeyer, threatened to cut international beer imports as part of his "black budget" and challenged New Zealand's brewers to "come up with an international-style lager beer". Lion (then New Zealand Breweries) produced a beer the following year named Steinecker, named after the company whose equipment the beer was made in. The beer's name was changed in 1962, not in response to a challenge from the Steinecker company, but to distinguish it from Heineken.

In 1973 Steinlager was launched in the United States and an American consultant suggested that to become successful the company should change the colour of their bottles to match that of other premium beers. As a result, the original brown bottle colour was changed to green.

Ingredients 
According to Steinlager, the Steinlager Pure beer contains malted barley, hops, yeast and water. The entire Steinlager range of beer is not gluten-free, and isn't considered suitable for those with coeliac disease.

Steinlager variants

Steinlager Blue 

In 1991, another beer bearing the Steinlager name was introduced. Steinlager Blue was marketed using an advertising campaign featuring The Blues Brothers. The two different tasting beers were known as Steinlager Blue or Steinlager Green which related to the colour of the bottle or can it came in (although Steinlager Blue was sold in a brown bottle). Steinlager Blue was discontinued in the later 1990s, leaving just Steinlager Green which then dropped the green from the name. Note the only reason Steinlager Blue & Green tasted different was the bottle colour. Beers bottled in green or clear bottles degrade under UV light. Both Steinlager beers were brewed in the same vat.

Steinlager Pure 

On the first of June 2007 Steinlager Pure was released in the New Zealand market. Steinlager "Pure" and Steinlager "Classic" are now sold alongside each other, with Steinlager Pure positioning itself at the premium end of the beer market. It is marketed with Harvey Keitel, Willem Dafoe and Vincent Gallo.

Steinlager Premium Light 

Introduced in 2000 as a low alcohol variant of Steinlager.

Steinlager Super Cold 

Introduced in 2006, Super Cold is simply Steinlager Classic served at 0 degrees Celsius.

Steinlager Edge 

Steinlager Edge was a mid-strength, low-carb variant of Steinlager. It is made from the same hops as Classic and Pure but has an alcohol content of just 3.5% compared to 5.0%. It was discontinued in 2013 due to poor sales.

Steinlager Tokyo Dry 

In 2016, Steinlager Tokyo Dry was introduced as "New Zealand raw ingredients meet Japanese brewing mastery".

Sponsorship 

Steinlager is actively involved in sponsorship of major New Zealand sports teams, probably the most high-profile rugby team in the world, the New Zealand All Blacks Rugby Union team, have had the support of Steinlager since 1986. Steinlager is also the current presenting sponsor of the United States leg of the IRB Sevens World Series.

Steinlager was involved in yacht racing with the maxi-ketch Steinlager 2, which was skippered by Peter Blake, won all six legs of the 1989–90 Whitbread Round the World Race, and again in 1995 with Team New Zealand with their "Black Magic" boat, which won the Americas Cup by beating Dennis Conner's defending boat Stars & Stripes, also known as Young America, 5-nil in the finals' series. Steinlager, along with Toyota, ENZA, TVNZ and Telecom New Zealand, formed the "family of five" major sponsors of Team New Zealand in 1995 and again in their successful defence of the cup in 2000.

In 2006, Steinlager provided sponsorship to specific USA Rugby Union teams, including Media Rugby Football Club and York/Lancaster Rugby Football Club, as part of a US marketing campaign.

References 

 Steinlager History
 All Blacks sponsorship deal
 More Steinlager info

External links
 Steinlager website

Beer in New Zealand
Kirin Group
America's Cup